Darby Township is one of the fourteen townships of Union County, Ohio, United States.  The 2010 census found 2,060 people in the township.

Geography
Located in the southern part of the county, it borders the following townships:
Paris Township - north
Millcreek Township - northeast
Jerome Township - east
Darby Township, Madison County - south
Pike Township, Madison County - southwest
Union Township - west

Several populated places are located in Darby Township:
A small part of the city of Marysville, the county seat of Union County, in the north
The village of Unionville Center in the south
The unincorporated community of Bridgeport, in the far west
The unincorporated community of Chuckery, in the far southwest

Name and history
Darby Township was organized in 1820, and named after the Big Darby Creek, which runs through the township.  The first settlers of the township were from Pennsylvania and Virginia. Statewide, other Darby Townships are located in Madison and Pickaway counties.

Government
The township is governed by a three-member board of trustees, who are elected in November of odd-numbered years to a four-year term beginning on the following January 1. Two are elected in the year after the presidential election and one is elected in the year before it. There is also an elected township fiscal officer, who serves a four-year term beginning on April 1 of the year after the election, which is held in November of the year before the presidential election. Vacancies in the fiscal officership or on the board of trustees are filled by the remaining trustees.

References

External links
County website

Townships in Union County, Ohio
Townships in Ohio